The UK Green Building Council (UKGBC) is a United Kingdom membership organisation, formed in 2007, which aims to 'radically transform' the way that the built environment in the UK is planned, designed, constructed, maintained and operated.

The council is concerned about the environmental impact of buildings and infrastructure on the environment, in particular the use of water, materials, energy, the impact of greenhouse gas emissions, and the health of building occupants.

Formation
The organisation was founded in the autumn of 2006 and launched in February 2007 in response to the 2004 Sustainable Building Task Group Report Better Buildings - Better Lives, which recommended the UK Government should "review the advisory bodies concerned with sustainable buildings to simplify and consolidate them and to provide clear direction to the industry" (para 1.8, p. 7).

Its first CEO was Paul King (formerly head of campaigns at WWF), who filled the role from its inception until December 2014, when he was succeeded by the current CEO, Julie Hirigoyen. In February 2023, the UKGBC confirmed Smith Mordak as its new CEO from 1 June 2023.

UKGBC is a charitable organisation, and - through the World Green Building Council - is part of a global network of like-minded organisations in almost 80 countries. Its headquarters is at The Building Centre in London.

See also

 Association for Environment Conscious Building
 Code for Sustainable Homes
 Energy efficiency in British housing
 Good Homes Alliance
 Green building
 Green Building Council
 Sustainable architecture

References

External links
 UK Green Building Council
 World Green Building Council

2006 establishments in the United Kingdom
Environmental organisations based in the United Kingdom
Green Building Councils
Housing in the United Kingdom
Low-energy building in the United Kingdom
Sustainability organizations
Sustainable building in the United Kingdom